Giru railway station is located on the North Coast line in Queensland, Australia. It serves the town of Giru. The station has one platform. Opposite the platform lies a passing loop.

Services
Giru is served by Traveltrain's Spirit of Queensland service.

References

External links

Giru station Queensland's Railways on the Internet

North Queensland
Regional railway stations in Queensland
North Coast railway line, Queensland